Violette Leduc (7 April 1907 – 28 May 1972) was a French writer.

Early life and education
She was born in Arras, Pas de Calais, France, on 7 April 1907. She was the illegitimate daughter of a servant girl, Berthe Leduc, and André Debaralle, the son of a rich Protestant family in Valenciennes, who subsequently refused to legitimize her. In Valenciennes, Violette spent most of her childhood suffering from poor self-esteem, exacerbated by her mother's hostility and excessive protectiveness. She developed tender friendships with her grandmother Fideline and her maternal aunt Laure. Her grandmother died when Leduc was a young child.

Her formal education began in 1913, but was interrupted by World War I. After the war, she went to a boarding school, the Collège de Douai, where she experienced lesbian affairs with her classmate "Isabelle P", which Leduc later adapted into the first part of her novel Ravages, and then the 1966 Thérèse et Isabelle. During her time at the Collège de Douai, she was introduced to what would become her first literary passions: the Russian classics, then Cocteau, Duhamel, Gide, Proust, and Rimbaud.

In 1925, Leduc embarked on an affair with a supervisor at the Collège, Denise Hertgès, four years her senior. The affair was later discovered, and Hertgès was dismissed from her job over the incident.

Career and personal life
In 1926, Leduc moved to Paris, along with her mother and step-father, and enrolled in the Lycée Racine. That same year, she failed her baccalaureate exam, and began working as a press cuttings clerk and secretary at Plon publishers, later becoming a writer of news pieces about their publications. She continued to live with Hertgès for nine years in the suburbs of Paris. Violette's mother Berthe encouraged her homosexual relations, believing this would protect Violette from illegitimate pregnancy.

In 1927, Violette met Jacques Mercier, seven years her senior, in a cinema. Despite her involvement with Denise Hertgès, Jacques Mercier continuously pursued Violette. This love triangle is the basis of the plot Ravages, wherein Violette is represented by the character "Thérèse", Jacques Mercier by "Marc", and Denise Hertgès by "Cécile". Violette's relationship with Denise ended in 1935. In 1939, Violette married Jacques Mercier. Their marriage was unsuccessful, and the two separated. During their separation, Violette discovered that she was pregnant, and she almost lost her life during an abortion.

In 1938, she met Maurice Sachs (future author of Le Sabbat), and in 1942, he took Violette to Normandy, where she wrote the manuscript of L'Asphyxie. During this time, Violette was also involved with trading on the black market, which allowed her to make a living.  In 1944, Violette saw Simone de Beauvoir, and in 1945, Violette gave Beauvoir a copy of the manuscript of L'Asphyxie. This interaction formed the basis of a friendship and mentorship between her and Beauvoir that lasted for the rest of her life. Her first novel, L'Asphyxie (In the Prison of Her Skin), was published by Albert Camus for Éditions Gallimard, and earned her praise from Jean-Paul Sartre, Jean Cocteau, and Jean Genet. Her friendship and love of Maurice Sachs is detailed in her autobiography La Bâtarde.

In 1955, Violette published her novel Ravages with Gallimard, but the editor censored the first one hundred and fifty page section of the book. This section depicted Violette's sexual encounters and defloration with her female classmate; Isabelle P. Gallimard censored this section by labelling it obscene. The censored part was eventually published as a separate novella, Thérèse and Isabelle, in 1966. Another novel, Le Taxi, caused controversy because of its depiction of incest between a brother and a sister. Critic Edith J. Benkov compared this novel with the work of Marguerite Duras and Nathalie Sarraute.

Leduc's best-known book, the memoir La Bâtarde, was published in 1964. It nearly won the Prix Goncourt, and quickly became a best-seller. She went on to write eight more books, including La Folie en tête (Mad in Pursuit), the second part of her literary autobiography.

In 1968, Radley Metzger made a film of Leduc's novel Thérèse and Isabelle. The film was a commercial feature about adolescent lesbian love, starring Essy Persson and Anna Gael.

Illness, death and legacy

Leduc developed breast cancer and died at the age of 65, after two operations. She was living at Faucon, Vaucluse, at the time of her death.

Violette is a 2013 French biographical drama film about Leduc. It was written and directed by Martin Provost and shown in the Special Presentation section at the 2013 Toronto International Film Festival.

List of works

 L'Asphyxie, 1946 (In the Prison of Her Skin, trans. Derek Coltman, 1970).
 L'affamée, 1948.
 Ravages, 1955.
 La vieille fille et le mort, 1958.
 Trésors à prendre, suivi de Les Boutons dorés, 1960.
 La Bâtarde, 1964 (La Bâtarde, trans. Derek Coltman, 1965).
 La Femme au petit renard, 1965 (The Lady and the Little Fox Fur).
 Thérèse et Isabelle, 1966 (Thérèse and Isabelle, trans. Sophie Lewis, The Feminist Press, 2015. )
 La Folie en tête, 1970 (Mad in Pursuit, trans. Derek Coltman, 1971)
 Le Taxi, 1971
 La Chasse à l'amour, 1973.

References

General
 
 

1907 births
1972 deaths
French bisexual writers
Deaths from cancer in France
Deaths from breast cancer
French erotica writers
Bisexual women
French LGBT novelists
French women novelists
20th-century French women writers
20th-century French novelists
Women erotica writers
People from Arras
20th-century French LGBT people
Signatories of the 1971 Manifesto of the 343